Christine Cushing: Cook With Me was a 2005-2006 Canadian cooking show that incorporated a variety of recipes and discussions. The host, Christine Cushing, is accompanied by three guests who fuel conversations and help cook the meals of the day. Each episode has a special menu to go along with the themed meal, such as "Girl's Poker Night", "The Big Game", and "At the Ranch".

Cook With Me was part of the Food Network (Canada), and episodes aired every weekday at 11:30 AM, 5:00 PM ET.

Host
Originally from Athens, Christine Cushing and her family moved across the world to Toronto, Canada when she was one. There she attended George Brown College and École de Cuisine La Varenne, completing the Food and Beverage Management program.

Cushing has taught Canadians how to cook for over 15 years. She recently launched a new series of recipes on how to cook cakes using olive oil.

TV appearances
 1999-2001 Life Network: Dish It Out
 2001-2006 Food Network Canada: Christine Cushing Live
 2009–present Oprah Winfrey Network: Fearless in the Kitchen

Episodes

References

External links

2005 Canadian television series debuts
2006 Canadian television series endings
Food Network (Canadian TV channel) original programming
2000s Canadian cooking television series